Eden is a city in Rockingham County in the U.S. state of North Carolina and is part of the Greensboro-High Point Metropolitan Statistical Area of the Piedmont Triad metro region. As of the 2020 census, the population was 15,405. From the late nineteenth century through much of the 20th, the city was a center of textile mills and manufacturing. The city was incorporated in 1967 through the consolidation of three towns: Leaksville, Spray, and Draper.

Geography
Eden is located at  (36.506434, -79.745092). The Smith and the Dan River have their confluence on the south side of Eden. The Dan River flows along Eden's southern border while the Smith River flows from the north bisecting the city on its route to meet the Dan River.

History

By the mid-eighteenth century, the territory of present-day Eden was within a  estate owned by William Byrd II, a planter of Virginia and North Carolina. He originally called his estate "The Land of Eden".

He envisioned an industrious, self-sufficient colony that would thrive on the abundance of the frontier. Byrd's dream was not to be realized. After years of negotiations, at least one boatload of Swiss did sail for "The Land of Eden" from Europe, but it was shipwrecked in a December gale off the coast of Virginia. None of the few survivors are believed to have reached Eden. Byrd died August 26, 1744. By that time, the "Land of Eden" began to be surrounded by small farms held by a wave of poor Scotch-Irish immigrants, whom Byrd had compared to the "Goths and Vandals."

"Eden" was inherited by William Byrd III, who shared none of his father's dreams of colonization. Young Byrd married Elizabeth Hill Carter in 1748. He sought to dispose of Eden to gain cash to support his grand lifestyle. He was finally successful on November 8, 1755, when he sold  in North Carolina to Simon and Francis Farley, two merchant brothers from the island of Antigua. By this time, yeoman settlement in the area was increasing at a considerable pace. The Farley brothers attempted to create plantations on some of the richest acres, but more frequently, settlers squatted on the land and built homesteads. In 1762 James Parke Farley, son of Francis Farley, went to Williamsburg to attend the College of William and Mary. He married Elizabeth Hill Byrd, daughter of William Byrd III and Elizabeth Hill Carter.

Many later settlers migrating to the Dan River Area knew little of William Byrd. They were familiar with an old Indian village in the area near Town Creek and the Farley holdings. This location became the center of settlement, and the  came to be called the Sauratown tract. In 1775, James Parke Farley and his new bride moved from cosmopolitan Williamsburg, Virginia, to Sauratown.

Farley claimed that Sauratown was his, created new plantations, and attempted to drive off the squatters. He built a home overlooking the Dan River. Farley was also a member of the 3rd Provincial Congress that met at Hillsboro. In 1776, the family left Sauratown. Elizabeth Farley's father's had committed suicide, and she appeared to dislike frontier life. Her husband James was killed during the Revolutionary War, leaving her a widow with four daughters to support. Development of Sauratown was unguided.

Farley's widow married Reverend John Dunbar, who attempted to manage Sauratown but failed. Finally, the Governor became involved in settling the legal interests of the Farley heirs. The , had become a destination for settlement due to its proximity to the Petersburg-Salem road, which crossed the Smith River at an island ford.

In 1795, the town of Leaksville was established on the southwest edge of the Sauratown along the main road. Joseph Cloud resurveyed the tract and divided it into two equal shares in 1798. A year later, Farley's daughters, Maria Farley and Rebecca Parke Farley, sold their shares to Patrick Henry of Virginia, noted as a rebel spokesman during the American Revolutionary War. On his deathbed June 6, 1799, Henry gave the land to two of his sons, Alexander Spottswood Henry and Nathaniel West Henry.

In the century that Sauratown was in existence, many families settled in the "Land of Eden", and their descendants have stayed in the area, including the Brodnax, Dillard, Ruffin, Morehead, Henry, and Winston families. Many Scots also settled in the area, including the Galloway, Scales, Watt, Lenox, Campbell, and Moir families. Other notable residents of the county include General Lighthorse Harry Lee.

20th century to present
Following previous unsuccessful referendums, on September 12, 1967, residents of Leaksville, Draper, Spray, and the unincorporated Meadows Greens Sanitary District voted to consolidate their communities, 2,252 to 1,753 with 60 percent of eligible voters participating. Of these, 784 elected to call the new city Eden, a term surveyor William Byrd II had used to describe the region in the 1700s. The consolidation took immediate effect, and Eden became the largest city in Rockingham County.

 In 1970, the city had considerable growth. 
 In 2000, city population grew to 15,908. 
 In 2010, the US Census population was 15,527. 
 In 2014, 39,000 thousand tons of coal ash and 27 million gallons of contaminated water spilled into the Dan River near Eden from a coal-fired power plant owned by Duke Energy.

In the late 1990s and early 2000s the local economy suffered due to the closure of several textile mills. Fieldcrest Cannon laid off hundreds of corporate staff in the 1990s, Pluma closed its plant in 1999, and Spray Cotton Mills closed its yarn mill in 2001, and Pillowtex folded in 2003. Some former workers moved to larger cities in search of jobs. The decline of textiles left the Miller Brewing Company's facility the town's flagship industry, but it announced its closure in 2015. The loss of the brewery and the textile mills had a knock-off effect on local retail stores, many of which closed due to the loss of customers and competition from national chains such as Walmart.

On the third weekend of September; Eden hosts the annual River Fest each year to celebrate Eden's history. The Boone Road Historic District, Bullard-Ray House, Cascade Plantation, Central Leaksville Historic District, Dempsey-Reynolds-Taylor House, First Baptist Church, Dr. Franklin King House-Idlewild, Leaksville Commercial Historic District, Leaksville-Spray Institute, Lower Sauratown Plantation, Mt. Sinai Baptist Church, Site 31RK1, Spray Industrial Historic District, St. Luke's Episcopal Church, Tanyard Shoal Sluice, Three Ledges Shoal Sluice, and Wide Mouth Shoal Sluice are listed on the National Register of Historic Places.

Major industry and economy

Eden has three downtown areas, concentrated in the former Leaksville, Spray, and Draper areas.

Benjamin Franklin Mebane started the first of his six textile mills in the area in 1893. Marshall Field took over the company in 1912 and named it Fieldcrest. The company made textile products that included bedding: sheets and blankets. It employed more than 3000 people. After taking over Cannon Mills in 1986, the company became known as Fieldcrest Cannon; it later moved its headquarters and 110 employees to Kannapolis, North Carolina. Changes and restructuring were affecting the textile industry throughout the South, as companies moved manufacturing operations to areas with cheaper labor, including offshore.

In 1997 Fieldcrest Cannon was sold to Pillowtex. Pillowtex closed its Eden plants in 2003, laying off the last 495 textile workers.

Miller Brewing Company ran a brewery in Eden into the early 21st century. In 2012 it still employed nearly seven hundred people, and produced nine million barrels annually. Miller announced in 2015 that it was shutting down the brewery by September 2016. In September 2020, it was announced Nestle Purina will move into the old MillerCoors facility and will open in 2022.

In February 2017, it was announced that the European-based German grocery store Lidl had broken ground on a store in Eden. It was expected to open in early 2018. As of April, 2019, the store had not opened.

In 1980 the Eden Mall, an approximately 400,000 square feet shopping center, was constructed. The mall began to decline in the 1990s when its Kmart store closed. More stores began to shut down, culminating in the departure of Peebles in 2008. The mall's physical condition deteriorated over the following years. It was sold in 2013 and subsequently leased out to local businesses.

Demographics

2020 census

As of the 2020 United States census, there were 15,421 people, 6,581 households, and 3,976 families residing in the city.

2000 census
As of the census of 2000, there were 15,908 people, 6,644 households, and 4,371 families residing in the city. The population density was 1,060.1 people per square mile (409.2/km2). There were 7,368 housing units at an average density of 491.0 per square mile (189.5/km2). The racial composition of the city was: 75.43% White, 22.15% Black or African American, 2.34% Hispanic or Latino American, 0.31% Asian American, 0.21% Native American, 0.06% Native Hawaiian or Other Pacific Islander, 1.03% some other race, and 0.81% two or more races.

There were 6,644 households, out of which 28.0% had children under the age of 18 living with them, 45.0% were married couples living together, 16.5% had a female householder with no husband present, and 34.2% were non-families. 31.0% of all households were made up of individuals, and 14.1% had someone living alone who was 65 years of age or older. The average household size was 2.34 and the average family size was 2.90.

In the city, the population was spread out, with 23.1% under the age of 18, 7.8% from 18 to 24, 27.4% from 25 to 44, 22.5% from 45 to 64, and 19.1% who were 65 years of age or older. The median age was 39 years. For every 100 females, there were 85.0 males. For every 100 women age 18 and over, there were 79.4 men.

The median income for a household in the city was $27,670, and the median income for a family was $35,259. Males had a median income of $29,443 versus $21,797 for females. The per capita income for the city was $15,275. About 13.9% of families and 17.2% of the population were below the poverty line, including 22.6% of those under age 18 and 16.6% of those age 65 or over.

The city has three elementary schools, one middle school, and one high school.

Regional and national awards
All-America City Award - 2011

Healthcare

UNC Health Rockingham: is a non-profit community hospital serves the surrounding cities within the Rockingham County area and the southern area of Virginia.
UNC Rockingham Rehabilitation and  Nursing Care Center
Morehead Wound Healing Center 
Cone Health Medical Group Heartcare of Eden 
Morehead Outpatient Rehab 
Piedmont Surgical Associates 
UNC Family Medicine at Eden 
Royalty Health and Wellness Resources 
Genesis Medical

Government
The City of Eden operates under an Council/Manager form type of government. Elected officials include the mayor, elected at-large, and seven council members. The Mayor and City Council serve for a term of Four years. The Mayor is the presiding officer and does not vote if the vote is tied. The Eden City Council meets monthly on the 1st Monday.

On November 12, 2017, Neville Hall took the office of mayor.

Sports 
The Leaksville-Draper-Spray Triplets was a former Minor League Baseball team combined from three separate towns in North Carolina. The team played from 1934 through 1942 in the Bi-State League, winning the championship titles in 1935 and 1942 seasons. It was the Affiliate team for various current and former  Major League Baseball teams such as, the Chicago Cubs, Cleveland Indians, and Brooklyn Dodgers.

Parks and recreation 
The city contains the following parks:
 Bridge Street Center 
 Freedom Ball Field Complex 
 Freedom Park 
 John E. Grogan Park 
 Mill Avenue Recreation Center 
 Mill Avenue swimming pool 
 Morgan Road Community Center 
 Peter Hill Park 
 Washington Street Park 
 Spray (Dehart) Community Center 
 Smith River Greenway 
 Skate Park

Transportation
Eden is provided service by Piedmont Triad International Airport located in nearby Greensboro, North Carolina and Shiloh Airport located in Stoneville, North Carolina. Highways serving Eden include US 311, NC 14, NC 87, NC 135, NC 700, and NC 770. The nearest Interstates to Eden are  I-73, I-40, I-85, from closest to furthest. Closest major highway to the city is US 220 / Future I-73, which intersects NC 770 in Stoneville, and NC 135 in Madison.

Culture

Festivals and events
Each year in September Eden host its annual Fall Riverfest, which celebrates the city's art, history, and river heritage. It is located in the "old" Leaksville shopping district on Washington Street, the oldest downtown street since 1917. Others include: Charlie Poole Music festival, which features music legends such as, Mike Seeger and the Osbourne brothers. The Eden chamber of commerce created the Eden Business Expo, as a venue for local businesses to present career opportunities, products, and services. Oink and Ale presents a block-style summer fest featuring entertainment, beer, and the city's best BBQ.

Eden Museum 
On September 19, 2009, the museum was officially opened. In 2010, the exhibits were completed.  The museum is an initiative of the Eden Preservation Society. The museum reflects on the city's history from the consolidation of Leaksville, Spray, and Draper, Triassic period, Saura Indians, William Byrd, Civil War, World Wars, the Korean War and much more.

Smith River Greenway 
The Smith River Greenway is a walking trail consisted with the Smith River that is 1.5 miles long extending along the Eden Family YMCA located on Kennedy street and Island ford landing filled with plenty of interesting plants and wildlife found in the trail. From a circumference view the Greenway can cross the smith river on meadow road. Local parking, picnic shelters, and restroom facilities are offered at the trailhead for visiting tourist. The city's next plan for the Greenway is to extend the trail towards the Spray dam.

On BoJack Horseman
Eden was featured in "The Amelia Earhart Story", the season 5 episode of the Netflix animated series BoJack Horseman. One of the show's characters, Princess Carolyn, is from Eden and returns to her hometown in seeking an adoption from a local girl.

Education
Rockingham County Schools serves the City of Eden. The Rockingham County School System was established in 1993.

Elementary schools 
Central Elementary School 
Douglas Elementary School 
Draper Elementary School (closed 2019–2020) 
Leaksville-Spray Elementary

Middle and high schools 
James E. Holmes Middle School
John Motley Morehead High School

Colleges and universities 
Rockingham Community College –  Wentworth, NC

Media

Radio Stations
WLOE at 1490 on the AM dial signed-on in 1946. The call letters stand for "Wonderful Land of Eden." The station is also heard at 92.5 FM.  
 WCLW at 1130 broadcasting a Southern gospel format, licensed to Eden. 
WPTI at 94.5 commercial FM talk and sports radio station serving the entire Piedmont Triad, also licensed to Eden.

Local newspapers
 Eden Daily News, a bi-weekly newspaper owned by Berkshire Hathaway
 Greensboro News & Record 
 The Reidsville Review
 Eden's Own Journal

Television stations
WFMY-TV, 2 CBS, Greensboro
WGHP, 8 Fox, High Point 
WXII-TV, 12 NBC, Winston-Salem
WGSR-LD, 19 Independent, Reidsville

Notable people
 Clint Barrow,  Harlem Bravado, professional wrestler for Ring of Honor wrestling
 Houston Barrow,  Lance Bravado, professional wrestler for Ring of Honor wrestling
 Tabitha Brown, actress and internet celebrity
 Herb Clarke, former weatherman and television journalist for WCAU
 Ben Cook, actor, appeared on NBC's 30 Rock, and HBO's Veep 
 Norwood Creek, film and television producer, director and editor 
 Antico Dalton, retired NFL and Canadian Football League player, World Bowl and Grey Cup Champion
 Carol M. Highsmith, Visual Documentarian of America for the Library of Congress
 Jennifer King, first full-time black female coach in NFL history
 Takayo Siddle, college basketball coach
 Edwin Wilson, professor at Wake Forest University
 Thomas Benton Fitzgerald, founder of Dan River Inc, lived at Willow Oaks Plantation
Princess Carolyn A Persian Cat

References

External links
 
 Welcome to Leaksville, North Carolina 
Eden chamber of commerce 
Explore Eden, NC

Cities in North Carolina
Cities in Rockingham County, North Carolina
Populated places established in 1755
1755 establishments in the Thirteen Colonies